The Otkhozoria–Tatunashvili List was compiled by the Georgian government to punish individuals responsible for crimes committed against Georgians in Abkhazia and South Ossetia since secessionist conflicts in the 1990s.

History

On 21 March, 2018, the Georgian Parliament adopted a resolution which obliged the Georgian government to compile a list of individuals implicated in crimes committed against Georgians in Abkhazia and South Ossetia since secessionist conflicts in these regions.  The idea of compiling a list came amid controversy surrounding the death of ethnic Georgian Archil Tatunashvili in South Ossetian prison. Tatunashvili was arrested by South Ossetian border patrol for illegally crossing the de facto Georgia–South Ossetia border. In February 2018, Tatunashvili died in custody in South Ossetian prison. South Ossetian authorities claimed that Tatunashvili died because of injuries suffered after he fell down a staircase. However, the evidence emerged that Tatunashvili was subjected to torture by South Ossetian prison guards due to his ethnic background, which the Georgian side claimed was the reason of his death. Previously, another ethnic Georgian Giga Otkhozoria was killed by Abkhazian border guard on the Georgian-controlled territory near the de facto Abkhazia–Georgia border. Frequency of such incidents prompted the Georgian authorities to take more active measures to effectively punish those responsible for such crimes against Georgians. The resolution which called for the creation of list was initially proposed by the deputies from the opposition European Georgia party and then supported by the ruling Georgian Dream coalition. It called the government to do everything it could to ensure the execution of justice and to work with other countries and international organizations to implement international sanctions against individuals in the list, namely visa, proprietary and transactional limitations. The government adopted the list on June 26, 2018. The list includes 33 Abkhazian and South Ossetian individuals who are implicated in crimes such as murder, kidnapping, torture and inhumane treatment, grievous bodily injury, as well as in covering up these actions by other individuals. The list includes individuals who are already found guilty by the court for these crimes as well as those who are awaiting trial. The prime minister Mamuka Bakhtadze said that the list would be expanded in the future and no individual who committed crimes against Georgians would be left unpunished.

On 9 August, 2018, the Lithuanian Government imposed restrictive measures on persons included in the Otkhozoria-Tatunashvili List.

On 8 November, 2018, the Irish Parliament passed a resolution expressing support for the Tatunashvili–Otkhozoria List and calling on the Government of Ireland to take respective restrictive measures.

On 17 December, 2018, the U.S. House of Representatives adopted Georgia Support Act, which provided sactions for individuals who violate human rights in the Russian-occupied regions of Georgia. The bill prohibits entry into the United States and demands the freezing of assets of all individuals who were charged with violation of fundamental human rights in Russian-occupied regions of Georgia and for those who assisted in the crimes. Georgian Foreign Minister David Zalkaliani said that the bill responds to the Tatunashvili–Otkhozoria list adopted by the Georgian government.

On 23 January, 2019, the Parliamentary Assembly of the Council of Europe (PACE) adopted the resolution on the Magnitsky List, in which it also expressed support for the Tatunashvili–Otkhozoria list, a "sanctions list of perpetrators and persons responsible for the cover-up of grave human rights violations" in Abkhazia and South Ossetia.

Notes

Reactions

Adoption of the list was deemed as "provocation" and "destructive action" by South Ossetian and Abkhazian authorities. Chairman of South Ossetian Parliament Peter Gasiev said that South Ossetia would respond by compiling its own "black list". Abkhazian social organization Aruaa came up with its own "Khishba–Sigua list", which included several former high-ranking Georgian officials such as former President Mikheil Saakashvili, former prime minister Vano Merabishvili, former interior minister Bachana Akhalaia, former defence minister Davit Kezerashvili, and former military commanders Gia Karkarashvili and Tengiz Kitovani.

See also
 Georgian-Ossetian conflict
 Georgian-Abkhazian conflict

References

2018 in politics
2018 in Georgia (country)
Georgia (country)–Russia relations
Abkhaz–Georgian conflict
Georgian–Ossetian conflict
Sanctions legislation
Human rights in Georgia (country)
South Ossetia
Abkhazia